James Pyle Wickersham (March 5, 1825-March 25, 1891) was an American educator and author in the state of Pennsylvania .  He also served as the US Chargé d'Affaires in Denmark in 1882.   

Wickersham was born in Chester County, Pennsylvania. He was of the fifth generation in direct descent from Thomas Wickersham, who in 1701 settled on a 1,000-acre tract of land in Chester County that had been deeded by William Penn in 1682 to his father-in-law, Anthony Killingbeck. The Wickersham family came from the parish of Bolney, county of Sussex, England.  Wickersham received a good education in the public schools and at Unionville Academy, near his birthplace.  When he was sixteen years old he was a teacher in a public school, and in 1845 he became principal of the Marietta (Pa.) academy.  He was the first county superintendent of Lancaster County in 1854, and in 1855 he opened the normal school at Millersville, Pa., which in 1859 became the first state normal school in Pennsylvania.  In 1866 he was appointed state superintendent of public instruction, and held that post for nearly fifteen years. He assisted in the organization of the Lancaster county educational association, and became its second president in 1863. He helped to organize the Pennsylvania state teachers' association, was its fourth president in 1855, assisted at the organization of the National Educational Association, and was its seventh president in 1865. He was twice elected president of the National department of school superintendents. 

In 1863 he raised a regiment of soldiers for three months' service, and commanded it during the Gettysburg campaign.  Lafayette gave him the degree of LL. D. in 1871. In 1882 he was appointed U. S. minister to Denmark.  He wrote on educational subjects for magazines and newspapers.  For ten years (1871-81) he was editor of the Pennsylvania School Journal.  His School Economy (Philadelphia. 1864) and Methods of Instruction (1865) have been translated into the Spanish, French, and Japanese languages. His  most elaborate work is the History of Education in Pennsylvania (1886).

External links 
 US Department of State bio
 

Ambassadors of the United States to Denmark
1825 births
Millersville University of Pennsylvania
American education writers
People from Chester County, Pennsylvania
1891 deaths